Yannick Schmid (born 11 May 1995) is a Swiss professional footballer who plays as a centre-back for Winterthur in the Swiss Super League.

Professional career
Schmid was loaned to FC Wohlen for the 2016–17 season. Schmid made his professional debut for FC Luzern in a 2–1 Swiss Super League win over Vaduz on 8 May 2016. He scored his first professional goal in 2–0 Swiss Super League win over St. Gallen on 9 August 2017.

International career
Schmid represented the Switzerland U20s in a friendly 1–1 draw with Germany U20s on 26 March 2016.

References

External links
 Soccerway Profile
 SFL Profile
 SFV National U-20 Profile

1995 births
Living people
Swiss men's footballers
Switzerland youth international footballers
FC Luzern players
FC Wohlen players
FC Vaduz players
Swiss expatriate footballers
Swiss expatriate sportspeople in Liechtenstein
Expatriate footballers in Liechtenstein
FC Winterthur players
Swiss Super League players
Swiss Challenge League players
Association football defenders
Sportspeople from Lucerne